The Copa de S.M. la Reina de Hockey Patines is an annual cup competition for Spanish women's rink hockey teams organized by the Spanish Skating Federation. First held in 2006, it is currently contested in spring by the top four team's in the OK Liga's table. CP Voltregà is the cup's most successful club with 6 titles, Biesca Gijón have 3 titles, while CP Vilanova and Cerdanyola CH have won one title each.

List of finals

Titles by team

See also
OK Liga Femenina

References

External links
2014 edition
 winners by year at fep.es

 
Recurring sporting events established in 2006
Women's sports competitions in Spain
2006 establishments in Spain
Women's roller hockey
Annual sporting events in Spain